Yekaterina Nagimaya is a Soviet sprint canoer who competed in the mid-1970s. She won two silver medals at the 1975 ICF Canoe Sprint World Championships in Belgrade, earning them in the K-2 500 m and K-4 500 m events.

References

Living people
Soviet female canoeists
Year of birth missing (living people)
Russian female canoeists
ICF Canoe Sprint World Championships medalists in kayak